Anastasiya Nikolayevna Yermakova (born 8 April 1983 in Moscow) is a Russian competitor in synchronised swimming and four-time Olympic champion.

She won gold medals in the duet competition with Anastasia Davydova at the 2004 Summer Olympics in Athens and 2008 Summer Olympics in Beijing, and was part of the Russian gold medal team in 2004 and 2008.

Now, she is training the Italian synchronized swimming team "Rarinantes Savona", and she is also a collaborator for the Italian national team of synchronized swimming. She has participated recently to the Italian program "Vite in Apnea", which was a reality show showing the training of the Italian national team of synchronized swimming, before the swimming world cup Barcelona 2013.

References

External links

 https://web.archive.org/web/20161220071053/http://www.rarinantes.sv.it/index.php/newshidden/1056-syncro-campionato-italiano-estivo-junior--la-blu-shelf-carisa-savona-sara-impegnta-dal-18-al-21-luglio-a-busto-arsizio.html
 https://web.archive.org/web/20160303235654/http://www.rarinantes.sv.it/index.php/societa/284-syncro-anastasia-ermakova-nuova-allenatrice-biancorossa

1983 births
Living people
Russian synchronized swimmers
Olympic medalists in synchronized swimming
Olympic synchronized swimmers of Russia
Olympic gold medalists for Russia
Synchronized swimmers at the 2004 Summer Olympics
Synchronized swimmers at the 2008 Summer Olympics
Medalists at the 2004 Summer Olympics
Medalists at the 2008 Summer Olympics
World Aquatics Championships medalists in synchronised swimming
Synchronized swimmers at the 2001 World Aquatics Championships
Synchronized swimmers at the 2003 World Aquatics Championships
Synchronized swimmers at the 2005 World Aquatics Championships
Synchronized swimmers at the 2007 World Aquatics Championships
Swimmers from Moscow